The 2008-09 Austrian National League season was contested by eight teams, and saw EHC Lustenau win the championship. All eight teams that participated in the regular season qualified for the playoffs.

Regular season

Playoffs

External links
Season on hockeyarchives.info

Austrian National League
2008–09 in Austrian ice hockey leagues
Austrian National League seasons